Murder of the Universe is the tenth studio album by Australian psychedelic rock band King Gizzard & the Lizard Wizard. It was released on 23 June 2017 by Flightless in Australia, ATO Records in the United States, and Heavenly Recordings in the United Kingdom. It is the second of five albums released by the band in 2017.

The album was nominated for Best Hard Rock or Heavy Metal Album at the ARIA Music Awards of 2017, despite controversy over the band's win the previous year with Nonagon Infinity. The band lost the award to Northlane for Mesmer.

Concept and storyline
Murder of the Universe is a concept album split into three separate stories, each containing elements of spoken word to carry a narrative. The first two suites feature Leah Senior's narration, while NaturalReader's "UK, Charles" text-to-speech application narrates the final suite.

The first suite, The Tale of the Altered Beast, explores themes of temptation and tells of a human who stumbles on a mystical human/beast hybrid creature dubbed the Altered Beast. The story starts with the pursuit of the human being, who slowly takes an interest in the idea of being altered – something considered taboo in the human's society. The perspective then changes to the Altered Beast itself, who is filled with murderous intentions. Confronted by the Beast, the human experiences a craving for power and slowly succumbs to the temptation of becoming altered. Accepting their mutual fate, the beast and human merge, creating a newly altered beast, who now craves even more flesh. However, the Altered Beast suffers greatly from absorbing another consciousness – it loses track of its identity and eventually dies of insanity, decaying into the earth. 

The second suite, The Lord of Lightning vs. Balrog, focuses on an epic battle between two entities dubbed The Lord of Lightning and Balrog, who represent the forces of light and darkness, respectively. The suite starts with a foreword from the perspective of a storyteller who recalls the battle. The action begins with the track "The Lord of Lightning", which is about the general destruction caused in a town by lightning fired from the entity's finger. He is perceived as evil and malevolent by the townsfolk. However, when he fires lightning at a corpse, it is somehow reanimated as a creature known as Balrog. This creature chooses to ignore the Lord of Lightning, and instead wreaks further havoc on the townspeople. The Lord chooses to fight the Balrog and defeats him, eventually leaving him as a burning corpse in "The Acrid Corpse". The Lord of Lightning then departs, choosing not to harm the townsfolk anymore.

The third and final suite, Han-Tyumi & The Murder of the Universe, is about a cyborg in a digital world who gains consciousness and, in confusion, decides to strive only for what a cyborg cannot do: vomit and die. He decides to create a creature dubbed the "Soy-Protein Munt Machine" whose only purpose is to vomit. When the creature rejects his love, Han-Tyumi decides to merge with the machine, which causes it to lose control. This machine explodes and infinitely expels vomit, which eventually engulfs the entire universe in a type of grey goo scenario: and so the universe is murdered.

Reception 

Murder of the Universe received positive reviews from music critics. On Metacritic, the album holds an average critic score of 73/100, based on 15 reviews, indicating "generally favorable reviews".

AllMusic's Tim Sendra wrote in his review for the album that "King Gizzard & the Lizard Wizard's second album of 2017 is a rampaging, feverish blast of sci-fi prog punctuated by whizzing synths and robotic voice-overs."

Exclaim!s Cosette Schulz commented that "The 21-track album is certainly the strangest and most draining release that King Gizzard have made to date; not as ambitious as the seamlessly looping Nonagon Infinity, or this year's earlier release Flying Microtonal Banana, but a feat nonetheless."

Accolades

Track listing 
All music composed by King Gizzard & the Lizard Wizard; all lyrics written by Stu Mackenzie; stories written by Mackenzie, except "Murder of the Universe" written by Joey Walker and Mackenzie.

Vinyl releases have tracks 1–12 on Side A, and tracks 12–21 on Side B; "The Lord of Lightning" is split between the two sides.

Personnel 
Credits for Murder of the Universe adapted from liner notes.

King Gizzard & the Lizard Wizard
 Stu Mackenzie – vocals, Hagström F12 guitar, Roland Juno-60 synthesizer, Yamaha DX-7 synthesizer, Mellotron flute, Mellotron choir, Yamaha Reface YC organ, Fender Mustang bass, Natural Reader UK Charles
 Michael Cavanagh – '62 Maxwin drum kit, '61 Yamaha Tiger Red Swirl kit
 Joey Walker – Yamaha SG-3 guitar, Yamaha Reface YC organ, Roland JX-3P synthesizer, Roland Juno-60 synthesizer
 Ambrose Kenny-Smith – Hohner Special 20 harmonica, Yamaha Reface YC organ
 Cook Craig – Rickenbacker 620 guitar
 Lucas Skinner – Fender Mustang bass
 Eric Moore – management

Additional musicians
 Leah Senior – spoken word 

Production
 Casey Hartnett – recording
 Stu Mackenzie – recording, production
 Michael Badger – recording, mixing
 Joey Walker – recording
 Joe Carra – mastering
 Jason Galea – artwork

Charts

References

2017 albums
ATO Records albums
Heavenly Recordings albums
King Gizzard & the Lizard Wizard albums
Concept albums
Flightless (record label) albums
Progressive metal albums by Australian artists
Science fiction concept albums